A screw machine may refer to a:
 
 Screw machine (automatic lathe), a small- to medium-sized automatic lathe that is mechanically automated via cams
 Screw machine (turning center), a small- to medium-sized turning center that is electronically automated via CNC
 Screw-cutting lathe
 Turret lathe, now rarely called screw machines

Automatic lathes